Montenegro debuted in the Eurovision Song Contest 2007 with the song "'Ajde, kroči" written by Slaven Knezović and Milan Perić. The song was performed by Stevan Faddy. The Montenegrin broadcaster Radio i televizija Crne Gore (RTCG) organised the national final MontenegroSong 2007 in order to select the Montenegrin entry for the 2007 contest in Helsinki, Finland. Ten entries competed in the national final on 25 February 2007 where public televoting selected "'Ajde, kroči" performed by Stevan Faddy as the winner with 4,747 votes. 

Montenegro competed in the semi-final of the Eurovision Song Contest which took place on 10 May 2007. Performing during the show in position 7, "'Ajde, kroči" was not announced among the top 10 entries of the semi-final and therefore did not qualify to compete in the final. It was later revealed that Montenegro placed twenty-second out of the 28 participating countries in the semi-final with 33 points.

Background 

RTCG would also broadcast the event within Montenegro and organise the selection process for the nation's entry. For 2007, a national final format was used to select the Montenegrin entry.

Before Eurovision

MontenegroSong 2007 
MontenegroSong 2007 was the national final organised by RTCG in order to select the Montenegrin entry for the Eurovision Song Contest 2007. Ten entries competed in a televised final on 25 February 2007, which was held during the TVCG programme Nedjeljno popodne at the RTCG studios in Podgorica and hosted by Dražen Bauković and Olivera Simunović.

Competing entries 
On 13 January 2007, RTCG opened a submission period where artists and songwriters were able to submit their entries until 9 February 2007. All artists and songwriters were required to be citizens of Montenegro and songs were required to be written in the Montenegrin language. RTCG received 16 entries at the closing of the deadline. A selection jury that consisted of KIC "Budo Tomović" music editor Maja Popović, composer Slobodan Kovačević and RTCG music editor Vesna Ivanović evaluated the received submissions and selected the top ten entries for the national final. The selected artists were announced on 14 February 2007 and their songs were announced on 17 February 2007.

Final 
The final took place on 25 February 2007. The ten competing entries were performed and "'Ajde, kroči" performed by Stevan Faddy was selected as the winner entirely by public televoting. 11,006 votes were received by the televote during the show. In addition to the performances of the competing entries, the show also featured guest performances by 2005 Serbian and Montenegrin Eurovision entrant No Name, 2007 Belarusian Eurovision entrant Dmitry Koldun and 2007 Slovenian Eurovision entrant Alenka Gotar.

Promotion 
Stevan Faddy specifically promoted "'Ajde, kroči" as the Montenegrin Eurovision entry on 8 March 2007 by performing the song during the final of the Serbian Eurovision national final Beovizija 2007.

At Eurovision
According to Eurovision rules, all nations with the exceptions of the host country, the "Big Four" (France, Germany, Spain and the United Kingdom) and the ten highest placed finishers in the 2006 contest are required to qualify from the semi-final on 10 May 2007 in order to compete for the final on 12 May 2007. On 12 March 2007, a special allocation draw was held which determined the running order for the semi-final and Montenegro was set to perform in position 7, following the entry from Georgia and before the entry from Switzerland. 

The two semi-finals and the final were broadcast in Montenegro on TVCG 2 with commentary by Dražen Bauković and Tamara Ivanković. The Montenegrin spokesperson, who announced the Montenegrin votes during the final, was Vidak Latković.

Semi-final 

Stevan Faddy took part in technical rehearsals on 3 and 5 May, followed by dress rehearsals on 11 and 12 May. The Montenegrin performance featured Stevan Faddy on stage with two bassists and a drummer in a band set-up. In the climax of the performance, the two bassists leaned towards the drummer with the camera spinning around the musicians. The LED screens displayed blue and grey colours with white light effects being used. The three musicians performing with Stevan Faddy were Jovan Coso (drums), Marko Perić (bass) and the co-composer of "'Ajde, kroči" Slaven Knezović (bass). Marko Perić previously represented Serbia and Montenegro in 2005 as part of No Name. Two backing vocalists, Neda Papović and Svetlana Raicković, were also part of the performance.

At the end of the show, Montenegro was not announced among the top 10 entries in the semi-final and therefore failed to qualify to compete in the final. It was later revealed that Montenegro placed twenty-second in the semi-final, receiving a total of 33 points.

Voting 
Below is a breakdown of points awarded to Montenegro and awarded by Montenegro in the semi-final and grand final of the contest. The nation awarded its 12 points to Serbia in the semi-final and the final of the contest.

Points awarded to Montenegro

Points awarded by Montenegro

References

2007
Countries in the Eurovision Song Contest 2007
Eurovision